Gary Smith (born July 26, 1954 in New Orleans) is an American philosopher and culture manager.

Gary Smith grew up in Austin, Texas. After graduating from high school in 1972, he went on to study philosophy and German in Houston and Boston as well as in Frankfurt as a DAAD scholarship recipient. After completing a dissertation on Walter Benjamin, Smith earned his doctorate in 1989 from Boston University. Between 1986 and 1992, Smith had teaching positions in Boston, Chicago, and Potsdam, Germany, as well as at the Berlin University, where he lectured on Jewish studies and philosophy. From 1992 to 1998, he led the Einstein Forum in Potsdam. From 1997 until 2014, he was Executive Director of the American Academy in Berlin. His academic publications include: Benjaminiana. Eine biographische Recherche, with Hans-Georg Puttnies; Gershom Scholem. Zwischen den Disziplinen; Amnestie, oder die Politik der Erinnerung in der Demokratie, with Avishai Margalit; Wissenbilder. Strategien der Überlieferung, with Ulrich Raullf; Hannah Arendt Revisited: Eichmann in Jerusalem.

For his dedication to the building of networks in knowledge and cultural exchange on the national and international levels, he earned the Cross of the Order of Merit of the Federal Republic of Germany in 2002. In 2011, the city of Berlin thanked Smith for his cultural and scholarly development of the German-American friendship and the contributions to the city with intellectual, challenging, and outstanding events with the Order of Merit of Berlin.

Smith is in his second marriage to the daughter of the former Berlin Mayor, Klaus Schütz. He has a son from his first marriage and a son as well as twin daughters from his second marriage.

References

External links
 Gary Smith is Executive Director Emeritus of the American Academy in Berlin
 Literature from and about Gary Smith

1954 births
Living people
People from New Orleans
People from Austin, Texas
American philosophers
Recipients of the Cross of the Order of Merit of the Federal Republic of Germany
Recipients of the Order of Merit of Berlin